Paul Hawke (born 4 July 1964) is a former Australian rules football player who played with the Sydney and Collingwood Football Clubs in the Australian Football League (AFL).

A versatile ruck-rover from the Wagga Tigers, Hawke kicked 23 goals in his debut season at Sydney. He represented New South Wales at the 1988 Adelaide Bicentennial Carnival. Hawke played his best football after he crossed to Collingwood and in 1989 averaged 25.89 disposals a game, 41 of them in a win over Richmond. He finished equal seventh in the Brownlow Medal, the best placed Collingwood player, but was runner-up in the Copeland Trophy. Collingwood broke through for a drought breaking premiership in 1990 but Hawke spent the entire season in the reserves. He returned to Sydney in 1991 but could only manage one appearance with the seniors.

References

1964 births
Living people
Australian rules footballers from New South Wales
Sydney Swans players
Collingwood Football Club players
New South Wales Australian rules football State of Origin players
Sportspeople from Wagga Wagga